The Kpelle  language (endonym: "Kpɛlɛɛ") is spoken by the Kpelle people of Liberia, Guinea and Ivory Coast and is part of the Mande family of languages. Guinean Kpelle (also known as Guerze in French), spoken by half a million people, concentrated primarily, but not exclusively, in the forest regions of Guinea, whose capital, Nzérékoré, is the third largest city in Guinea and the largest city in the Guinée forestière region of south-eastern Guinea bordering Liberia, Ivory Coast, and Sierra Leone. Half a million Liberians speak Liberian Kpelle, which is taught in Liberian schools.

Sample 
The Lord's Prayer in Kpelle:
Kunâŋ gáa ŋele sui,
Tɔɔ ku iláai siɣe a maa waa. 
Tɔɔ Ikâloŋ-laai é pá, 
Tɔɔ ínîa-mɛni é kέ, 
Nɔii ma ɓɛ yɛ̂ɛ berei gáa la Ɣâla-taai. 
I kukɔ sâa a kuɣele-kuu tɔnɔ-tɔnɔ mii-sɛŋ; 
I ipôlu fe kutɔ̂ŋ-karaa-ŋai dîa, 
Yɛ̂ɛ berei kwa kupôlu fè la kuɓarâai ditɔ̂ŋ-karaa-ŋai dîai; 
Tɔɔ kutúɛ kufe pili yee-laa-maa su, 
Kέlɛ, i kukúla mɛni nyɔ́mɔɔ su.

Phonology

Consonants

Vowels

References

External links
PanAfriL10n page on Kpelle/Guerzé
Omniglot: Kpelle syllabary

Languages of Liberia
Languages of Guinea
Mande languages
Kpelle people